The 2015 Colonial Athletic Association men's basketball tournament was held March 6–9, 2015 at Royal Farms Arena in Baltimore, Maryland. The champion received an automatic bid to the 2015 NCAA tournament.  The 2015 tournament featured 10 teams due to the addition of Elon to the CAA.

Seeds

Schedule

Bracket

* Denotes overtime period.

All-Tournament Team
 Quincy Ford, Northeastern (Most Outstanding Performer)
 Scott Eatherton, Northeastern
 Juan'ya Green, Hofstra
 Omar Prewitt, William & Mary
 Marcus Thornton, William & Mary
 David Walker, Northeastern

Game summaries

First round

Quarterfinals

Semifinals

Championship

Team and tournament leaders

Team leaders

References

External links
 2015 Men's CAA Hoops Championship

Colonial Athletic Association men's basketball tournament
Tournament
CAA men's basketball tournament
CAA men's basketball tournament
Basketball competitions in Baltimore
College sports tournaments in Maryland